Burkikhan (Aghul: Гехъуьн) is a rural locality (a selo) in Agulsky District, Republic of Dagestan, Russia. The population was 1,194 as of 2010.

Geography 
Burkikhan is located 6 km northwest of Tpig (the district's administrative centre) by road. Tpig is the nearest rural locality.

References 

Rural localities in Agulsky District